The Kapalua LPGA Classic was a golf tournament on the United States-based LPGA Tour. The event was played in 2008 at the Kapalua Resort in Kapalua near Lahaina, on the island of Maui in Hawaii.

History
For purposes of qualification for the season-ending LPGA Playoffs at The ADT, it was a "standard" event, which means that players earned points toward the playoffs, but the winner did not receive an automatic playoff spot. The point system was ended after the 2008 season.

The tournament was held for only one year, at the Bay Course at Kapalua Resort. It was originally announced that the tournament would be played for a minimum of three years, and the event was placed on the 2009 LPGA schedule for October 12–18, 2009.  However, in June 2009, four months before the tournament was scheduled to take place, event organizers announced its cancellation, citing the lack of a title sponsor.

Winners

Tournament record

References

External links
LPGA official tournament microsite

Former LPGA Tour events
Golf in Hawaii
Sports in Maui
History of women in Hawaii
Defunct sports competitions in the United States
2008 establishments in Hawaii
2008 disestablishments in Hawaii